Launch Complex 11 (LC-11) at Cape Canaveral Space Force Station, Florida, is a launch complex used by Atlas missiles between 1958 and 1964. It is the southernmost of the launch pads known as Missile Row. When it was built, it, along with complexes 12, 13 and 14, featured a more robust design than many contemporary pads, due to the greater power of the Atlas compared to other rockets of the time. The rockets were delivered to the launch pad by a ramp on the southwest side of the launch pedestal.

Thirty-two Atlas B, D, E and F missiles were launched on suborbital test flights from LC-11. The first launch to use the complex was Atlas 3B, the first flight of a complete Atlas, which was launched on 19 July 1958. In addition to the suborbital tests, one orbital launch was conducted from the complex. On 18 December 1958, Atlas 10B launched SCORE, the world's first communications satellite, into low Earth orbit.

The area of LC-11 is currently leased to Blue Origin.

Explosions
Two on-pad explosions occurred on LC-11. The first was Missile 48D in April 1960, which suffered combustion instability and exploded on the pad. Although no specific cause for the combustion instability could be determined, the separate duct for the booster turbine exhaust had been removed from the Atlas pads at CCAS earlier in the year since it was considered unnecessary and complicated ground testing of the missiles. The failure occurred slightly under a month after Missile 51D had exploded on LC-13 due to combustion instability, and after these back-to-back failures, it was decided to put the exhaust duct back on the pads. Although there was no evidence indicating that the lack of the exhaust ducts caused the failures, program officials decided to play it safe, and in any case wanted the pads to conform with Atlas D silo configurations.

The second explosion on LC-11 was when Missile 11F blew up one second after liftoff in April 1962 due to a turbopump failure. In both causes, pad damage was relatively light and LC-11 restored to use in two months.

Later history
Following the end of Atlas testing at Cape Canaveral, LC-11 was the only one of the four Atlas pads to not be used for space launches, and hence was first of the four pads to be deactivated. Following deactivation, the mobile service tower and support equipment were dismantled, and the site was unmaintained for over 50 years.

Blue Origin use

Blue Origin has leased the site to redevelop it for their use. On March 29, 2017, it was reported that Blue Origin has chosen LC-11 to conduct test firings of the BE-4 engine. LC-11 is located near Spaceport Florida Launch Complex 36, which will support launches of Blue Origin's New Glenn Launch Vehicle, currently scheduled for a launch no-earlier then 2020.  Throughout 2017, aerial / satellite imagery from Planet Explorer showed that construction of a new facility was underway there. In 2019 aerial photos showed a complete test stand. The test stands have two bays allow Blue Origin to test two engines at once.

References
Encyclopedia Astronautica - LC11

Cape Canaveral Space Force Station